Umyeonsan-ro is a road in Gyeonggi Province and Seoul, South Korea.

Stopovers
 Gyeonggi Province
 Gwacheon
 Seoul
 Seocho District

List of Facilities 
 Notes
 IC : Interchange (나들목)
 IS : Intersection (평면 교차로)
 TG : Tollgate (요금소)
 BR : Bridge (교량)
 TN : Tunnel (터널)
 Light purple(■): Local Route 309 section
 Light pink(■): Seoul City Route 31 section

References

Roads in Seoul
Roads in Gyeonggi